Sahni (alternatively Sawhney, Sahney, Shahani, or Sahani) are Punjabi Khatri clan and surname found among the Hindus or Sikhs of Punjab, India. Sahnis are a part of the Khukhrain sub-caste/family-group of the Khatris.

Notable people with the surname include:

 Rajnanjay Sahani, IT admin, worked in India & Africa (Democratic Republic of Congo).

 Ajai Sahni, author and expert on counter-terrorism
 Ajay Prakash Sawhney, Indian Civil Servant (Former Secretary, MEITy, 2016-2022)
 Baljit Sahni (born 1987), Indian football player
 Balraj Sahni (1913–1973), Hindi film actor
 Bhisham Sahni (1915–2003), Hindi writer, playwright, and actor
 Birbal Sahni (1891–1949), an Indian paleobotanist
 Harpreet Sawhney, American engineer
 Jaideep Sahni (born 1974), Indian screenwriter, songwriter, and film producer
 Mahendra Sahni, Indian politician
 Mohanbir Sawhney, professor at Kellogg School of Management
 Nilam Sawhney, Indian Civil Servant (Former Chief Secretary, Andhra Pradesh)
 Nitin Sawhney, British Indian musician and composer
 Parikshit Sahni (born 1940), Indian actor
 Pritam Singh Sahni, Punjabi poet
 Rajan Sawhney (born 1970/71), Canadian politician
 S K Sahni, Indian Army lieutenant-general
 Sartaj Sahni, US-based computer scientist
 Vikramjit Singh Sahney, Indian entrepreneur and social worker

See also 
 Sahni, Punjab, a village near Lakhpur, India

References

Surnames
Indian surnames
Hindu surnames
Surnames of Indian origin
Punjabi-language surnames
Khatri clans
Khatri surnames